Nataliya Yakovleva may refer to:
 Natalya Yakovleva (handballer) (born 1986), team handball player from Kazakhstan
 Nataliya Yakovleva (swimmer) (born 1971), Russian swimmer